The Class C12 is a type of 2-6-2T steam locomotive built by the Japanese Government Railways and the Japanese National Railways from 1932 to 1947. A total of 282 Class C12 locomotives were built and designed by Hideo Shima .

Service outside Japan

North China Transport プレA, China Railways PL51, Vietnam Railways 131 
From 1938 to 1939, 60 C12s were converted to metre gauge and shipped to the North China Transportation Company, where they operated primarily between Zhengding and Taiyuan. They were classified プレA (PureA). In 1939 Shijiazhuang–Taiyuan Railway was converted to standard gauge, these locomotives removed to Datong–Puzhou Railway north section. After the establishment of the People's Republic of China, they were taken over by the China Railway, where they were classified ㄆㄌ51 in 1951, and PL51 in 1959. In 1956 the Datong–Puzhou Railway north section was reconverted to standard gauge, they were transferred to Vietnam, and they were classified 131.

Taiwan Railways Administration CK120 
From 1936 to 1941, the Nippon-Sharyo was built in 7 C12s for Governor-General of Taiwan Railway. After World War II, they were taken over by Taiwan Railways Administration, and they were classified CK120. CK124 is preserved at Changhua Locomotive Depot.

Indonesian State Railways Class C32
In 1943, the Imperial Japanese Army sent two locomotives, C12 94 and C12 168, to Surabaya, Java for a military transport with a 1067 mm gauge. They were based at Sidotopo depot. The original knuckle coupler were replaced with Norwegian coupler. After the war, the two locomotives were received by the Indonesian Railways and were classed as C32. The Indonesian Railways only used them as shunters for goods wagons in Surabaya area as their profile are too big for Indonesian Railways loading gauge. Both of the locomotives were scrapped around 1980s.

Preserved examples
26 Class C12 locomotives are preserved, as listed below, with four in working order.

Operational
 C12 66: Mooka Railway Mooka Line, Mooka, Tochigi (operational)
 C12 167: Wakasa Railway (operational, runs on compressed air)
 C12 244: Akechi Line (operational, runs on compressed air)

 C12 4 (CK124): Taiwan Railways, Changhua Railway Roundhouse (operational)

Static

 C12 2: Mikasa, Hokkaido
 C12 5
 C12 6
 C12 29
 C12 38
 C12 49
 C12 60
 C12 64
 C12 67
 C12 69
 C12 74
 C12 85
 C12 88: Itoigawa, Niigata
 C12 119 (131-428): Preserved in Da Lat Railway Station in Dalat city, Lam Dong province, Vietnam
 C12 163
 C12 164: Operated on the Ōigawa Railway until 2005.
 C12 171
 C12 187
 C12 199
 C12 208: Ōigawa Railway, Shimada, Shizuoka (used for spares)
 C12 222
 C12 230
 C12 231: Preserved in front of Uchiko Station in Uchiko, Ehime. Built in 1939 and withdrawn in 1970, it was first preserved in the grounds of an elementary school before being moved to Uchiko Station in 1997.
 C12 241
 C12 259
 C12 280: Preserved in Komatsushima Station Park in Komatsushima, Tokushima
 C12 287

See also

 Japan Railways locomotive numbering and classification
JNR Class C58
JNR Class C63

References

 

1067 mm gauge locomotives of Japan
Steam locomotives of Japan
Steam locomotives of Vietnam
Steam locomotives of China
Steam locomotives of Taiwan
2-6-2T locomotives
Hitachi locomotives
Kawasaki locomotives
Preserved steam locomotives of Japan
Railway locomotives introduced in 1932